Nipissing University is a public university located in North Bay, Ontario, Canada. It overlooks Lake Nipissing, where it provides individualized student experiences through supportive and accessible professors, small class sizes and undergraduate research opportunities.

History

Northeastern University (1960–1967)
The roots of Nipissing University date back to 1947, when residents of North Bay formed a committee with the goal of establishing a university within the city. The 1958 Northeastern University Committee continued their efforts in the following years. By 1960, Northeastern University was established and for a short time in 1960–1961, the institution offered first year university courses in Arts, Science, and Commerce in facilities provided by a local Catholic boys' high school. Its application to the Ontario Ministry of Education for a degree-granting university charter was denied on February 28, 1961, and the classes ended shortly thereafter.

By mid-1962, Northeastern University had leased new space on Cassells Street in North Bay and arranged for Laurentian University professors to teach extension night classes there. This arrangement continued through mid-1967, with students receiving credits from Laurentian for the coursework done in these classes.

Nipissing College (1967–1992)
To ensure its funding as a university-level institution, Northeastern University changed its name to Nipissing College and signed an affiliation agreement with Laurentian University in 1967. Students attending Nipissing College in North Bay were also officially students of Laurentian University (headquartered in Sudbury, Ontario, 125 km away) with Laurentian being the degree-granting institution.

In 1972, the College Education Centre officially opened. This building, which is still home to Nipissing University, was shared between multiple other educational institutions including Canadore College, a school of nursing, and a teachers' college. In 1973, the North Bay Teachers' College was incorporated into Nipissing College as the Faculty of Education.

Nipissing University (since 1992)
Nipissing University received its charter as an independent university in 1992, thus allowing the school to grant baccalaureate degrees. On December 12, 2001, the government of Ontario passed a bill revising the university's charter to permit it to grant graduate degrees.

The governance of Nipissing University is modelled on the provincial University of Toronto Act of 1906, which established a bicameral system of university government consisting of a senate (faculty), responsible for academic policy, and a board of governors (citizens) exercising exclusive control over financial policy and having formal authority in all other matters. The president, appointed by the board, is to provide a link between the two bodies and to perform institutional leadership.

Academics

The university is composed of three faculties: the Faculty of Applied and Professional Studies; the Faulty of Arts and Science; and the Schulich School of Education; as well as the School of Graduate Studies. Nipissing University has approximately 5000 undergraduate students, the majority of which are full-time students, and 150 graduate students (current as of 2016). Applicants entering from high school must have a minimum of 70%, or 75% if applying for a degree in Criminal Justice or Concurrent Education, to be considered for full-time (30 credits) study. Cut-off averages for each program change annually. The graduation rate at Nipissing University is 85.9%, which is higher than the average Ontario graduation rate of 77.3%.

Nipissing University offers over 30 areas of study, many of which have opportunities for internships or experiential learning. Some partnership programs, such as Environmental Biology and Technology, Criminology and Criminal Justice (Policing Stream), and Social Welfare and Social Development allow students to earn both a bachelor's degree and a college diploma from Canadore College in four years. Nipissing also has a collaborative nursing program with Canadore, giving students access the college's nursing simulation labs.

Formally known as the Faculty of Education, the Schulich School of Education was established in 2010 due to a donation from philanthropist Seymour Schulich. Programs within the Schulich School of Education include both Concurrent and Consecutive Bachelor of Educations degrees as well as a Bachelor of Physical and Health Education.

Undergraduate programs 
Nipissing University offers the following undergraduate degrees:
 Bachelor of Arts (BA) with majors in: Anthropology, Child and Family Studies, Classical Studies, Computer Science, Criminal Justice (with streams in Corrections, Criminal Justice Studies, Criminology, and Policing), Economics, English Studies, Environmental Geography, Gender Equality and Social Justice, Geography, History, Liberal Arts, Mathematics, Native Studies, Philosophy, Political Science, Psychology, Religions and Cultures, Social Welfare and Social Development, and Sociology
 Bachelor of Business Administration (BBA)
 Bachelor of Fine Arts (BFA)
 Bachelor of Physical and Health Education (BPHE)
 Bachelor of Science (BSc) with majors in: Biology, Computer Science, Environmental Biology and Technology, Environmental and Physical Geography, Liberal Science, Mathematics, and Psychology
 Bachelor of Science in Nursing (BScN)
 Bachelor of Social Work (BSW)
 Bachelor of Arts (BA) or Bachelor of Science (BSc) combined with Bachelor of Commerce (Bcomm)
 Concurrent Bachelor of Arts (BA)/Bachelor of Education (BEd)
 Concurrent Bachelor of Business Administration (BBA)/Bachelor of Education (BEd)
 Concurrent Bachelor of Physical and Health Education (BPHE)/Bachelor of Education (BEd)
 Concurrent Bachelor of Science (BSc)/Bachelor of Education (BEd)

Graduate and professional programs 
The following graduate and professional programs are offered at Nipissing University:
 Consecutive Bachelor of Education
 Master of Arts in sociology
 Master of Education
 Master of Environmental Science
 Master of Environmental Studies
 Master of Science in kinesiology
 Master of Science in mathematics
 PhD in education with a focus on Educational Sustainability

Additional credentials 
Certificates are offered in:
 Aboriginal Leadership
 Applied Behaviour Analysis - Lifespan
 Bilingualism
 Digital Classics
 Digital Humanities
 Early Intensive Behaviour Intervention - Autism Spectrum Disorder
 Entrepreneurial Finance
 Environmental Management
 Financial Services
 Financial Product Sales Professional
 Forest Resource Management and Conservation
 Game Design and Development
 Geomatics
 Health Studies and Gerontology
 Human Resources Management
 iLEAD Business Experience
 Neuroscience
 Peace and Violence Prevention
 Program Evaluation and Applied Research

Joint programs 
The following joint programs are offered through Nipissing University and Canadore College:
 The Bachelor of Arts in Criminology and Criminal Justice policing stream involves courses at Nipissing University and Canadore College, allowing students to obtain a college diploma and a university degree at the same time
 Students in the Bachelor of Arts Honours Specialization degree in Social Welfare and Social Development can also obtain a Social Service Worker college diploma from Canadore College while completing their university degree
 The Bachelor of Science in Nursing program has partnered with Canadore, allowing students to access Canadore's simulation labs
 The Environmental Technology and Science program offers students both a Bachelor of Science degree from Nipissing and an Environmental Technician - Protection and Compliance diploma from Canadore

Student life

Student union

The Nipissing University Student Union (NUSU) is the official body representing the student point of view at Nipissing. All students, both full-time and part-time, belong to the Student Union and fund the organization through their incidental fees. NUSU deals with many aspects of student life on campus, including the academic governance of the university and social events.

Nipissing University students are able to elect student executive representatives. These roles include: President, VP Governance & Legal Affairs, VP Finance, VP Communications, and VP Services.

The executives are also part of NUSU's Board of Directors, which includes another 10 student positions. The Directors-at-Large are part of the highest decision-making body of NUSU and hold accountable the executives to their job while making decisions on behalf of the student population.

NUSU's executives sit on Nipissing University's Board of Governors and Academic Senate. Elections are held annually for executive positions (paid), NUSU Board of Director positions (volunteer) and Student Senator positions (volunteer). NUSU's student membership belongs to the Canadian Federation of Students (CFS-Local 20).

Clubs and activities 
Nipissing University has a variety of clubs and activities. Clubs are sanctioned by NUSU and run by students. Common club categories include academics, recreation, volunteerism, current social topics, and religion.

Nipissing University has over 20 km of trails. These trails are accessible for hiking in the warmer months and for snowshoeing or cross-country skiing in the winter. Points of interest include the Lookout Tower and Duchesnay Falls.

Students at Nipissing may also partake in intramural sports, such as dodge ball, slo-pitch, and ultimate Frisbee. Fitness classes, which include Zumba, kickboxing, and yoga, are held in the R.J. Surtees Student Athletics Centre and vary by semester.

Work study 
Nipissing University has a Work Study Program (called NUWork) that enables students with financial need to work part-time on campus. Students in the NUWork program are capped at a maximum of ten hours per week and have flexible hours to accommodate class schedules. The majority of work study jobs begin in September and may include positions such as research assistants, athletics facility staff, or technology service technicians. It is expected that students will have explored all possible funding options, including OSAP, before applying for this program.

Residences
Nipissing University has four residence complexes: Chancellors House, Founders House, Governors House, and the Townhouse Residence Complex. Chancellors, Founders, and Governors are suite-style residences with four students per suite. First-year students coming directly from high school and who receive full-time admission are guaranteed a single room in one of these suite-style residences. The Townhouse Residence Complex is reserved for upper year students (second year and up). The townhouses have a six-bedroom floor plan and represent a stepping stone between the suite-style living and living off campus. All suites and townhouses have their own full kitchen. Each residence complex has a team of residence life student staff including residence dons, academic dons, residence office assistants, residents' council facilitators, and residents' council executives.

Athletics
The university is represented in the Ontario University Athletics and U Sports (formerly called "Canadian Interuniversity Sport") by the Nipissing Lakers. The school colours are green and blue and the mascot is Louie the Laker. The university offers seven varsity sports and five club sports. They include:

Varsity Sports
 Basketball
 Cross-country Running
 Volleyball
 Soccer
 Rowing
 Ice Hockey
 Nordic Skiing
Club Sports
 Lacrosse
 Ringette
 Squash
 Cheerleading
 Dance
Nipissing Athletics is housed in the Robert J. Surtees Student Athletics Centre, which has undergone multiple expansions since it opened in 2001. The Athletic Centre features three full-sized gymnasiums, two squash courts, three fitness studios, a weight room, and a cardio-weight room. The main gym, which hosts the varsity volleyball and basketball games, has a seating capacity of approximately 1200 people. The soccer pitch and Frisbee golf course are located behind the Athletic Centre. A main feature of the Athletic Centre is the Living Wall, a hydroponic green wall of plants that improves the air quality of the facility due to the oxygen it produces. Nipissing students also have access to a gym facility shared with Canadore College, which is located within the Main Campus building.

Harris Learning Library 

Nipissing University's Harris Learning Library, named in honour of former Ontario premier and North Bay Teachers' College alumnus Mike Harris, opened on June 20, 2011. In 2012, the Harris Learning Library received the American Library Association's Interior Design Award. The following year, the library was presented with a New Library Building Award from the Ontario Library Association for its architectural design. The Giving Tree, a two-story metal and engineered wood sculpture in the shape of a tree, won the Design Edge Canada Award in 2012. The sculpture stands in the foyer of the library and features the names of the library's donors.

Based at the North Bay campus, the Harris Learning Library's services extend to Canadore College, students located at Nipissing's Brantford Campus, online/distance students, and members of the community. The Harris Learning Library has a diverse collection of information resources and services, including books, DVDs, archives, streamed videos, e-Books, online journals, and a collection of educational resources. Students have access to learning spaces such as group study rooms, silent study spaces, a brightly lit Thomson Reading Room, a computer lab, and Adaptive Technology rooms. The library welcomes approximately 169 000 visitors each year. On March 30, 2017, the library celebrated its one-millionth visitor.

Research 
The research culture at Nipissing University is growing quickly as researchers receive more funding for their work. Students and staff, with the help of The Office of Research Services, can apply for internal research grants or external grants from the three major granting agencies, NSERC, SSHRC, and CIHR. Nipissing University receives upwards of $350 000 annually from the Research Support Fund to help manage research endeavours at the school. Research facilities, centres, and laboratories at Nipissing University include:

 Central Analytical Facility
 Analytical and Environmental Chemistry Laboratory
 Biomechanics and Ergonomics Laboratory
 Collaborative Systems Laboratory
 Centre for Literacy - Elizabeth Thorn
 Drosophila Laboratory - Genetics and Aging
 Evolution Laboratory
 Forest Resources Laboratory
 Geomatics Laboratory
 Integrative Watershed Research Centre (IWRC)
 Laboratory of Social Neuroendocrinology
 Nipissing Earth Observation Laboratory (NEOL)
 Nipissing University Greenhouse Complex
 Nipissing University Research on Neuroscience (NURON)
 Northern Canadian Centre for Research in Education and the Arts (NORCCEA)
 Northern Centre for Research on Aging and Communication
 Plant Ecology Research Laboratory (PERL)
 Plant Growth Facility
 Physics Laboratory
 Robotics Laboratory
 Salamander and Newt Research Laboratory
 Sensory Movement Behavioural Laboratory
Nipissing University hosts an annual Undergraduate Research Conference, to which student from all over Ontario attend. Students may present posters, papers, or art installations. Eligible scholarly works may include, but are not limited to: scientific experiments, case studies, interpretation of literature, or model design and development.

Indigenous programs 
Nipissing University has close ties with Indigenous Peoples of the area. The Office of Indigenous Initiatives aims to help all students reach success at university, whether or not they self-identify as Indigenous. Their services include: Student Success Programming and Advocacy, Enji Giigdoyang Student Lounge and Sacred Space, Elder in Residence program, Wiidooktaadwin Aboriginal Mentorship Initiatives, Debwendizon Annual Aboriginal Youth Education Gathering, Indigenous Week, Annual Welcome Powwow, and the Enji Giigdoyang Speaker Series.

Aboriginal Advantage Program 
The Aboriginal Advantage Program is a transition program for Indigenous students. It is offered to first year students, whether they are entering from high school, transferring from college, or are a mature student. The Aboriginal Advantage Program gives these students a taste of university by allowing them to earn up to 24 university credits while receiving academic and personal support.

Peer 2 Peer Aboriginal Mentorship Initiative 
The Peer 2 Peer Aboriginal Mentorship Initiative at Nipissing University aims to connect upper year Indigenous students who are new to post-secondary education or those looking for additional resources and supports. Mentors provide academic and cultural support, answer questions about services for students, and attend university and community events with peers.

Campuses
Nipissing University's main campus is a North Bay facility shared with Canadore College. It had a satellite campus in Brantford until 2019.

Honorary doctorates
Nipissing University awards up to five honorary degrees each year. These degrees are awarded on the basis of national stature, contributions to Nipissing University, society, or scholarships, or academic background. Notable honorary doctors include:

Tom Jenkins - Doctor of Letters
Clint Malarchuk - Doctor of Letters
Jeannette Corbiere Lavell - Doctor of Education
Edmund Metatawabin - Doctor of Education
Graeme Murray - Doctor of Education
Vince Hawkes - Doctor of Letters
Colin Simpson - Doctor of Letters
Rush - Doctor of Music
Giles Blunt - Doctor of Education
Frances Lankin - Doctor of Education
Harry LaForme - Doctor of Education
Shelagh Rogers - Doctor of Education
Craig Oliver - Doctor of Letters
Paul Martin - Doctor of Education
Bill Davis - Doctor of Education
John Ralston Saul - Doctor of Letters
Shawn Atleo - Doctor of Education
Paul Quarrington - Doctor of Letters
Mike Harris - Doctor of Letters
Jon Dellandrea - Doctor of Letters
David Onley - Doctor of Education
Stephen Lewis - Doctor of Education
Joseph Boyden - Doctor of Letters
Roberta Jamieson - Doctor of Education
Eric Schweig - Doctor of Education
Dave Marshall - Doctor of Education
Maude Barlow - Doctor of Letters
Harry Rosen - Doctor of Letters
James Fraser Mustard - Doctor of Education

Arms

References

External links

 Nipissing University
 Nipissing University Student Union
 Nipissing University Library
 Association of Universities and Colleges of Canada profile

 
1967 establishments in Ontario
Buildings and structures in Nipissing District
Education in Brantford
Educational institutions established in 1967
Liberal arts colleges